Laotian–Chinese relations (Chinese: 中老关系/中寮關係) refers to the current and historical relationship between Lao People's Democratic Republic and the People's Republic of China (Red China).

History 
The Lao kingdom of Lan Xang and its successor states were tributaries of Ming and later Qing China. In the late 15th century, the Chinese backed Lan Xang against their common rival, the Vietnamese. Chinese traders operated in Lan Xang like any other Southeast Asian country, however, Lan Xang also proved to be important as a participant in the Tea-Horse Road trade. Relations between the two states were re-established in 1953 with the Republic of China (Nationalist China or Taiwan) as the sole legitimate government of China. On 25 April 1961, Laos switched recognition to the PRC government in Beijing. However, on 16 May 1962, the royal government severed diplomatic relations with Red China and restored relations with the Taipei government, aligning with the anti-communist alliance in the Vietnam War until 1975 when the new Lao communist government re-established relations with the PRC. Laos is represented by the Taipei Economic and Cultural Representative Office in Hanoi for ROC-related matters.

Economy 
Relations have consisted of trade and aid, largely focused on road construction in the northern provinces of Laos, without directly challenging the interests of Thailand or Vietnam in the central and southern regions. However, Vietnam's invasion of Cambodia in December 1978 to unseat the Khmer Rouge regime provoked China into a limited invasion of Vietnam—approximately nineteen kilometers deep—to "teach Vietnam a lesson." Laos was caught in a dangerous bind, not wanting to further provoke China, but not able to oppose its special partner, Vietnam. The Laotian leadership survived the dilemma by making slightly delayed pronouncements in support of Vietnam after some intraparty debate and by sharply reducing diplomatic relations with China to the chargé d'affaires level—without a full break. The low point in China-Laotian relations came in 1979, with reports of Chinese assistance and training of Hmong resistance forces under General Vang Pao in China's Yunnan Province.

Government 
This hostile relationship gradually softened, however, and in 1989 Prime Minister Kaysone Phomvihane paid a state visit to Beijing. In 1991 Kaysone chose to spend his vacation in China rather than make his customary visit to the Soviet Union. Diplomatic and party-to-party relations were normalized in 1989. Trade expanded from the local sale of consumer goods to the granting of eleven investment licenses in 1991—including an automotive assembly plant. Following the establishment of the Laotian-Chinese Joint Border Committee in 1991, meetings held during 1992 resulted in an agreement delineating their common border. China's commercial investments and trade with Laos expanded quietly, but not dramatically, in 1993 and 1994.

CCP general secretary Xi Jinping held talks with LPRP general secretary Bounnhang Vorachit in 2016, seeking further coordination in international affairs.

Belt and Road Initiative 
Prior to this meeting, in 2015, Laos joined the People's Republic of China global infrastructure project the Belt and Road Initiative. Together the countries have most notably engaged in the construction of the China-Laos Railway project. The first stage of this railway connects Kunming to the Laotian capital city, Vientiane. This project is estimated to have cost in the region of $5.9 up to $6.7 billion, which amounts to roughly 1/3 to nearly 1/2 of Laos’ annual GDP. The intention behind the construction of the railway has been to eventually connect China to Singapore via railway and help facilitate trade for Laos, given its landlocked nature. It has raised controversy as Laos is already currently over $1.8 billion short of being able “to address the projected fiscal deficit and repay domestic and overseas loans by the end of the year” as stated by Finance Minister Bounchon Oubonpaseut. This issues is exacerbated by the fact Laos only stands to hold 30% ownership of the railway, with the other 70% split between Chinese state companies. [6]

In June 2020, Laos was one of 53 countries that backed the Hong Kong national security law at the United Nations.

See also
 China–Laos border

Bibliography

References 
6. https://thediplomat.com/2021/12/laos-china-railway-inaugurated-amid-mounting-debt-concerns/

 
Laos
China, Peoples Republic
Economy of Yunnan